Stachytarpheta jamaicensis is a species of plant in the family Verbenaceae, native throughout the Caribbean, including Florida. It has many common names including blue porterweed, blue snake weed, bastard vervain, Brazilian tea, Jamaica vervain, light-blue snakeweed, and, in St. Croix, worryvine.source? It usually is found along country roadsides, and it also grows well as a ruderal plant on disturbed terrain. 

A similar plant, Stachytarpheta cayennensis, which is an invasive species in Florida, is sometimes mistaken for S. jamaicensis. 

It is unclear whether S. indica is a separate species.

Medicinal uses 
The fresh leaves are consumed in bush tea as a “cooling” tonic and blood cleanser, to treat “asthma” and “ulcerated stomachs”.

Tea brewed from this species has been shown to cause a dose-dependent "fall in [the] blood pressure" of normal rabbits. However, the tea has also been observed to cause a "mild non-dose dependent systematic toxicity" in various tissues throughout the body, "such as congestion, fatty changes, and necrosis in liver, blood vessels, kidney, lung and testis, but the brain, eyes, intestines and heart were essentially normal."

Gallery

References

External links 

Stachytarpheta indica - Mangrove.my

jamaicensis